Sternschanze (lit. Star Sconce) is a quarter in the center of Hamburg (Germany) within the Altona borough. In 2014, the population was 7,776 on an area of 0.6 sq km with a density of 14,113 inhabitants per sq km. After Reeperbahn, it is Hamburg's best known entertainment and nightlife district. It is also known as Schanzenviertel and nicknamed Schanze.

History
The name of the quarter originates from a sconce (German: Schanze) formed like a star which has been built in the area in 1682 in front of the Hamburg Wallring. From the 1930s to the 1970s the quarter was home for a large number of working-class people. Since the 1970s, families and students have started to move into the area. It is nearly, but not fully, congruent with the entertainment district of Schanzenviertel with its many bars and clubs, which is dubbed "Schanze" by its inhabitants. In the local slang, residents here live "in the sconce" ("in der Schanze").

The former concert house/theater building Rote Flora (built in 1888 as Flora concert hall) is also located here, at the street of Schulterblatt. It was squatted by leftist groups in 1989, after there were plans since 1987/88 to rebuild it as a new musical theater. These plans were later realized near Holstenstraße station as Neue Flora. Since the beginning of the occupation, Rote Flora was used for cultural events by the squatting groups. In 2000, the building was acquired by real-estate agent Klausmartin Kretschmer, under a contract where the city of Hamburg prohibited him to make any alterations. Because he planned to make alterations anyway, conflicts arose with residents. In 2014, Hamburg city re-bought the building to avoid further conflicts; the building was renovated in 2015 by volunteers.

Since the beginning of the new millennium, Sternschanze is en vogue and subject to gentrification. Nevertheless, political demonstrations, mostly by leftist groups, take place here and sometimes lead to clashes with the police, frequently on 1 May (German Labour Day). Graffiti paintings can be found on many walls throughout the quarter. In 2008, the area of Schanzenviertel, which formerly was cut into three parts by the boundaries of Hamburg-Mitte, Eimsbüttel, and Altona, was merged into the new quarter of Sternschanze, which since then 
has belonged only to the Altona borough.

Politics
These are the results of Sternschanze in the Hamburg state election:

Geography
Sternschanze is located between the quarters of St. Pauli, Altona-Altstadt, Eimsbüttel, and Rotherbaum.

Transportation
Sternschanze station is serviced by Hamburg S-Bahn (lines S11, S21, S31) and U-Bahn trains (U3 line), Feldstraße - which is officially located in neighbouring St. Pauli quarter - by the underground line U3 only. Schlump station is located on the north eastern boundaries of the Sternschanze quarter and served by underground lines U2 and U3.

References

External links
Sternschanze at Hamburg.de, in German

Altona, Hamburg
Entertainment districts in Germany
Quarters of Hamburg